The Australian Journal of Education is a peer-reviewed academic journal that publishes papers in the field of education. The journal's editor is Kylie Hillman. It has been in publication since 1957 and is currently published by SAGE Publications in association with Australian Council for Educational Research.

Scope 
The Australian Journal of Education is an international peer-reviewed journal publishing research conducted in Australia and internationally to inform educational researchers, as well as educators, administrators and policy-makers, about issues of contemporary concern in education.

Abstracting and indexing 

Australian Journal of Education is abstracted and indexed in, among other databases: Australian Education Index,  Scopus, and the Social Sciences Citation Index. According to the Journal Citation Reports, its 2012 impact factor is 0.351, ranking it 172 out of 216 journals in the category "Education & Educational Research".

References

External links 
 
 Australian Council for Educational Research website

SAGE Publishing academic journals
English-language journals
Education journals
Triannual journals
Publications established in 1957